The Battle of Nowy Dwór was fought during September 20 – September 30, 1655 between forces of the Polish–Lithuanian Commonwealth commanded by Jan Kazimierz Krasiński on one side, and on the other Swedish Empire forces commanded by Gustaf Otto Stenbock. It ended in Swedish victory.

Background 
On September 8, 1655, Swedish forces under King Charles X Gustav entered Warsaw, which had been abandoned by John II Casimir of Poland on August 18. At the same time, in the village of Mogilno near Zakroczym, Mazovian levée en masse gathered to fight the invaders. It was commanded by Voivode of Płock, Jan Kazimierz Krasinski. Swedish forces, including such units, as Jämtlands fältjägarregemente and Norrlands dragonregemente, sent from Warsaw to face the Poles, decided to cross the Narew near Nowy Dwor Mazowiecki.

The battle
On September 21, the Swedes approached Nowy Dwor. Polish camp was located on a 30-meter hill, located at the confluence of the Vistula and Bugonarew. Swedish troops quickly captured Nowy Dwor and began construction of a bridge. Their commandant, Gustaf Otto Stenbock was well aware of the fact that in previous battles, the Polish szlachta of the levée en masse had capitulated to the Swedes without fighting. Therefore, on September 28, Stenbock urged the Poles to capitulate, but their offer was rejected. An exchange of fire began, in which Swedish artillery had an advantage. Covered by the cannons, Swedish reiters crossed the Narew, finishing construction of the bridge, and digging trenches, which protected the river crossing.

In the morning of September 30, Stenbock's army crossed the river and attacked Polish positions. The battle took place in the area where now the district of Modlin is located. Swedish fire forced the Masurians to withdraw north. Mobility of Polish units prevented them from complete destruction, as the Swedes were too slow to chase them. Polish losses amounted to some 300 killed.

On the next day the Poles counterattacked, but without success. Swedish advance continued, and the invaders captured Pułtusk.

Aftermath 
Swedish victory opened the road towards the Grand Duchy of Lithuania and Livonia, while Swedish engineers noticed strategic importance of the location of the battle. In the following months, they constructed here a permanent fortified position, the so-called Bugskansen. This star-shaped military camp was main supply depot and concentration point of the Swedish-Brandenburgian army during the Battle of Warsaw. In the early 19th century, the Modlin Fortress was built in the location of the Bugskansen.

Sources 
 Leszek Podhorodecki, Rapier i koncerz, Warszawa 1985, str. 261-262

Second Northern War
Conflicts in 1655
1655 in Europe
Nowy Dwor
Nowy Dwor
History of Masovian Voivodeship
1655 in the Polish–Lithuanian Commonwealth